The 2016 Scottish parliament election was held on Thursday, 5 May 2016 to elect 129 members to the Scottish Parliament. It was the fifth election held since the devolved parliament was established in 1999. It was the first parliamentary election in Scotland in which 16 and 17 year olds were eligible to vote, under the provisions of the Scottish Elections (Reduction of Voting Age) Act. It was also the first time the three largest parties were led by women.

Parliament went into dissolution on 24 March 2016, allowing the official period of campaigning to get underway. Five parties had MSPs in the previous parliament: Scottish National Party (SNP) led by First Minister Nicola Sturgeon, Scottish Labour led by Kezia Dugdale, Scottish Conservatives led by Ruth Davidson, Scottish Liberal Democrats led by Willie Rennie, Scottish Greens, led by their co-conveners Patrick Harvie and Maggie Chapman. Of those five parties, four changed their leader since the 2011 election.

During the campaign, a series of televised debates took place, including party leaders of the elected parties. BBC Scotland held the first leaders' debate on 24 March, STV broadcast the next on 29 March, and BBC Scotland hosted the final debate on 1 May.

The election resulted in a hung parliament with the Scottish National Party winning a third term in government, but falling two seats short of securing a second consecutive overall majority. The Conservatives saw a significant increase in support and replaced the Labour Party as the second-largest party and main opposition in the Scottish Parliament. This was the first time that Labour had finished in third place at a Scottish election in 98 years. The Scottish Greens won six seats on the regional list and overtook the Liberal Democrats, who remained on five seats.

Although the SNP had lost their majority, it was still by far the largest single party in the Scottish Parliament, with more than double the seats of the Conservatives. Accordingly, Sturgeon announced she would form a minority SNP government. She was voted in for a second term as First Minister on 17 May.

Date
Under the Scotland Act 1998, an ordinary election to the Scottish Parliament would normally have been held on the first Thursday in May four years after the 2011 election, i.e. in May 2015. In May 2010, the new UK Government stated in its coalition agreement that the next United Kingdom general election would also be held in May 2015. This proposal was criticised by the Scottish National Party and Labour, as it had been recommended after the 2007 election that elections with different voting systems should be held on separate days: a recommendation which all of the political parties had then accepted. In response to this criticism, Deputy Prime Minister Nick Clegg offered the right to vary the date of the Scottish Parliament election by a year either way. All the main political parties then stated their support for delaying the election by a year. The Fixed-term Parliaments Act 2011, a statute of the UK Parliament, moved the date of the Scottish Parliament election to 5 May 2016.

The date of the poll may be varied by up to one month either way by the monarch, on the proposal of the Presiding Officer.

If Parliament itself resolves that it should be dissolved, with at least two-thirds of the Members (i.e. 86 Members) voting in favour, the Presiding Officer proposes a date for an extraordinary election and the Parliament is dissolved by the monarch by royal proclamation.

It does not necessarily require a two-thirds majority to precipitate an extraordinary election, because under the Scotland Act Parliament is also dissolved if it fails to nominate one of its members to be First Minister within certain time limits, irrespective of whether at the beginning or in the middle of a parliamentary term. Therefore, if the First Minister resigned, Parliament would then have 28 days to elect a successor (s46(2)b and s46(3)a). If no new First Minister was elected then the Presiding Officer would ask for Parliament to be dissolved under s3(1)a. This process could also be triggered if the First Minister lost a vote of confidence by a simple majority (i.e. more than 50%), as they must then resign (Scotland Act 1998 s45(2)). To date the Parliament has never held a vote of no confidence in a First Minister.

No extraordinary elections have been held to date. Any extraordinary elections would be in addition to ordinary elections, unless held less than six months before the due date of an ordinary election, in which case they supplant it. The subsequent ordinary election reverts to the first Thursday in May, a multiple of four years after 1999.

It was envisaged that the election would still have taken place as scheduled if Scotland had voted in favour of independence in 2014.

Retiring MSPs

Deselected MSPs

Changes to the SNP's selection procedures the previous year in order to ensure gender balance of candidates meant that any incumbent constituency MSP who chose to retire would have their replacement selected from an all-woman shortlist. The only ways for a new male candidate to receive a constituency nomination would be to stand in a constituency currently held by an opposition MSP or to run a de-selection campaign against a sitting MSP. For that reason there were far more challenges than normal within the SNP, but only two were successful:

Election system, seats, and regions

The total number of Members of the Scottish Parliament (MSPs) elected to the Parliament is 129.

The First Periodical Review of the Scottish Parliament's constituencies and regions by the Boundary Commission for Scotland, was announced on 3 July 2007. The Commission published its provisional proposals for the regional boundaries in 2009.

The Scottish Parliament uses an Additional Members System, designed to produce approximate proportional representation for each region. There are 8 regions, each sub-divided into smaller constituencies. There are a total of 73 constituencies. Each constituency elects one MSP by the plurality (first past the post) system of election. Each region elects 7 additional MSPs using an additional member system. 
A modified D'Hondt method, using the constituency results, is used to elect these additional MSPs.

The Scottish Parliament constituencies have not been coterminous with Scottish Westminster constituencies since the 2005 general election, when the 72 former UK Parliament constituencies were replaced with a new set of 59, generally larger, constituencies (see Scottish Parliament (Constituencies) Act 2004). The boundaries used for the Scottish Parliament elections were then revised for the 2011 election. The Boundary Commission also recommended changes to the electoral regions used to elect "list" members of the Scottish Parliament, which were also implemented in 2011.

Campaign
On 29 February 2016, BBC Scotland's Scotland 2016 current affairs programme held a debate focusing on education featuring the Education Minister Angela Constance and three party leaders: Kezia Dugdale, Ruth Davidson and Willie Rennie.

On 24 March 2016, BBC Scotland held a debate in Glasgow which was televised that featured Dugdale, Davidson, Rennie, Nicola Sturgeon, Patrick Harvie and David Coburn.

On 29 March 2016, STV hosted a televised leaders' debate, featuring the five leaders of the parties which held seats in the last Parliament.

From 5–26 April 2016, Scotland 2016 also held a series of weekly subject debates on Tuesday nights. The subjects were Tax, Health, Energy & Environment, and Housing. Of these, six parties (SNP, Labour, Conservatives and Liberal Democrats, the Scottish Greens and UKIP) were invited to the Tax debate.

Parties contesting the election
The official nomination period closed on 1 April 2016, lists of candidates were then published by local councils once the applications had been processed.

In March 2015, the Scottish Greens balloted their members to select candidates for their regional lists. The SNP released their regional candidate list in October 2015. The Conservative regional candidate list followed in December. In January 2016, RISE – Scotland's Left Alliance announced list candidates for all regions except the North East. Labour had announced a new selection process for regional candidates in November 2013, then revealed their full list of regional candidates in February 2016. UKIP's regional candidates were picked by their executive committee, prompting one prospective candidate to resign his party membership.

Contesting constituency and regional ballot
The SNP, the Scottish Labour, the Scottish Conservatives and the Scottish Liberal Democrats fielded candidates in all 73 constituencies.

  Scottish National Party (SNP)
  Scottish Labour
  Scottish Conservatives
  Scottish Liberal Democrats
  Scottish Greens – contesting all regions and Coatbridge and Chryston, Edinburgh Central and Glasgow Kelvin constituencies.  
  Scottish Libertarian Party − contesting West of Scotland, Mid Scotland Fife, North East Scotland region only and Edinburgh Central constituency

Contesting regional ballot only
  Clydesdale and South Scotland Independent – contesting South Scotland
  Communist Party – contesting North East Scotland
  National Front – contesting North East Scotland only
  RISE – Respect, Independence, Socialism and Environmentalism – contesting all regions
  Scottish Christian Party "Proclaiming Christ’s Lordship" – contesting Highlands and Islands and North East
  Solidarity – Scotland's Socialist Movement – contesting all regions
  UK Independence Party – contesting all regions
  Women's Equality Party – contesting Lothian and Glasgow

Contesting constituency ballot only
  Trade Unionist and Socialist Coalition (TUSC): Glasgow Cathcart, Glasgow Pollok, Glasgow Shettleston, Renfrewshire North and West, Dundee City East and Dundee City West
  Independent candidates

Opinion polling

The chart shows the relative state of the parties since polling began from 2012, until the date of the election. The constituency vote is shown as semi-transparent lines, while the regional vote is shown in full lines.

Result

|-
| style="background-color:white" colspan=15 | 
|-
! rowspan=2 colspan=2 | Party
! colspan=5 | Constituencies
! colspan=5 | Regional additional members
! colspan=5 | Total seats
|-
! Votes !! % !! ± !! Seats !! ± !! Votes !! % !! ± !! Seats !! ± !! Total !! ± !! %
|-

|-
|style="text-align:left"; colspan="2" | Valid votes || 2,279,154 || 99.6 || 0.1 || colspan="2"|   || 2,285,752 || 99.8 || 0.1 || colspan="5"|  
|-
|style="text-align:left"; colspan="2" | Spoilt votes || 9,215 || 0.4 || 0.1 || colspan="2"|   || 3,812 || 0.2 || 0.1 || colspan="5"|  
|-
!style="text-align:left"; colspan="2" | Total || 2,288,369 || 100 ||   || 73 || – || 2,289,564 || 100 ||   || 56 || – || 129 || – || 100
|-
|style="text-align:left"; colspan="2" | Electorate/Turnout || 4,099,907 || 55.8 || 5.3 || colspan="2"|   || 4,099,907 || 55.8 || 5.3 || colspan="5"|  
|}

Votes summary

Central Scotland

|-
! colspan=2 style="width: 200px"|Constituency
! style="width: 150px"|Elected member
! style="width: 300px"|Result
 
 
 
 
 
 
 
 
 

|-
! colspan="2" style="width: 150px"|Party
! Elected candidates
! style="width: 40px"|Seats
! style="width: 40px"|+/−
! style="width: 50px"|Votes
! style="width: 40px"|%
! style="width: 40px"|+/−%
|-

Glasgow

|-
! colspan=2 style="width: 200px"|Constituency
! style="width: 150px"|Elected member
! style="width: 300px"|Result
 
 
 
 
 
 
 
 
 

|-
! colspan="2" style="width: 150px"|Party
! Elected candidates
! style="width: 40px"|Seats
! style="width: 40px"|+/−
! style="width: 50px"|Votes
! style="width: 40px"|%
! style="width: 40px"|+/−%
|-

Highlands and Islands 

|-
! colspan=2 style="width: 200px"|Constituency
! style="width: 150px"|Elected member
! style="width: 300px"|Result
 
 
 
 
 
 
 
 

|-
! colspan="2" style="width: 150px"|Party
! Elected candidates
! style="width: 40px"|Seats
! style="width: 40px"|+/−
! style="width: 50px"|Votes
! style="width: 40px"|%
! style="width: 40px"|+/−%
|-

Lothian 

|-
! colspan=2 style="width: 200px"|Constituency
! style="width: 150px"|Elected member
! style="width: 300px"|Result
 
 
 
 
 
 
 
 
 

|-
! colspan="2" style="width: 150px"|Party
! Elected candidates
! style="width: 40px"|Seats
! style="width: 40px"|+/−
! style="width: 50px"|Votes
! style="width: 40px"|%
! style="width: 40px"|+/−%
|-

Margo MacDonald had been elected on the Lothian regional list in 2011, as an Independent; she died in 2014.

Mid Scotland and Fife

|-
! colspan=2 style="width: 200px"|Constituency
! style="width: 150px"|Elected member
! style="width: 300px"|Result
 
 
 
 
 
 
 
 
 

|-
! colspan="2" style="width: 150px"|Party
! Elected candidates
! style="width: 40px"|Seats
! style="width: 40px"|+/−
! style="width: 50px"|Votes
! style="width: 40px"|%
! style="width: 40px"|+/−%
|-

North East Scotland

|-
! colspan=2 style="width: 200px"|Constituency
! style="width: 150px"|Elected member
! style="width: 300px"|Result
 
 
 
 
 
 

|-
! colspan="2" style="width: 150px"|Party
! Elected candidates
! style="width: 40px"|Seats
! style="width: 40px"|+/−
! style="width: 50px"|Votes
! style="width: 40px"|%
! style="width: 40px"|+/−%
|-

South Scotland

|-
! colspan=2 style="width: 200px"|Constituency
! style="width: 150px"|Elected member
! style="width: 300px"|Result
 
 
 
 
 
 
 
 
 

|-
! colspan="2" style="width: 150px"|Party
! Elected candidates
! style="width: 40px"|Seats
! style="width: 40px"|+/−
! style="width: 50px"|Votes
! style="width: 40px"|%
! style="width: 40px"|+/−%
|-

West Scotland

|-
! colspan=2 style="width: 200px"|Constituency
! style="width: 150px"|Elected member
! style="width: 300px"|Result
 
 
  
 
 
 
 
 
 
 

|-
! colspan="2" style="width: 150px"|Party
! Elected candidates
! style="width: 40px"|Seats
! style="width: 40px"|+/−
! style="width: 50px"|Votes
! style="width: 40px"|%
! style="width: 40px"|+/−%
|-

Target seats
Below are listed all the constituencies which required a swing of less than 5% from the 2011 result to change hands.

SNP targets

Labour targets

Conservative targets

Liberal Democrat targets

Incumbents defeated

* Formerly SNP

See also

Other elections in the UK being held on the same day
 2016 London Assembly election
 2016 London mayoral election
 2016 National Assembly for Wales election
 2016 Northern Ireland Assembly election
 2016 United Kingdom local elections

UK parliamentary by-elections
2016 Ogmore by-election
2016 Sheffield Brightside and Hillsborough by-election

References

External links
 McNeill and Stone's Guide to candidates
 report on 2016 election by Electoral Commission

Party manifestos
 RISE – Scotland's Left Alliance: Another Scotland is possible
 Scottish Conservative and Unionist Party: A strong opposition – A stronger Scotland
 Scottish Green Party: A better Scotland needs a bolder Holyrood
 Scottish Liberal Democrats: Be the best again
 Scottish National Party: The next steps to a better Scotland
 UK Independence Party: Shake up Holyrood
 Women's Equality Party: Scotland Manifesto

2016
Scottish Parliament election, 2016
Scottish Parliament election, 2016
2010s elections in Scotland
May 2016 events in the United Kingdom